Martín Darío Leiva  (born 23 April 1980) is an Argentine professional basketball player who plays for Boca Juniors of the Liga Nacional de Básquet and BCL Americas. He is 2.10 m (6 ft 11 in) tall, and he plays at the center position.

Professional career
Leiva debuted in the LNB (Argentine 1st Division) on 12 October 1997, playing for Ferro Carril Oeste, against Independiente de General Pico. He played four seasons with Ferro, and then 6 with Boca Juniors in the top division. With Boca, he won the 2003–04 and 2006–07 seasons of the LNB.

In 2007, he moved to Spain to play for Autocid Ford Burgos, and the following season for Baloncesto León, both in the LEB (Spanish 2nd Division).

In 2009, he returned to Argentina, signing for Peñarol de Mar del Plata. Upon his return, he helped the team win the 2009–10 and 2010–11 seasons of the LNB, as well as the 2009–10 FIBA Americas League.

On 30 September 2019, Leiva returned to Boca Juniors.

National team career
Leiva played with the junior national team of Argentina at the 1999 FIBA Under-19 World Cup. He has been a member of the senior men's Argentine national basketball team. In 2011, he was selected by coach Julio Lamas for the 2011 FIBA Americas Championship team.  He competed at the 2012 Summer Olympics on the US team.

References

External links
FIBA.com Profile
LatinBasket.com Profile

1980 births
Living people
Argentine expatriate basketball people in Spain
Argentine men's basketball players
Basketball players at the 1999 Pan American Games
Basketball players at the 2003 Pan American Games
Basketball players at the 2007 Pan American Games
Basketball players at the 2012 Summer Olympics
Boca Juniors basketball players
Centers (basketball)
Estudiantes Concordia basketball players
Ferro Carril Oeste basketball players
Obras Sanitarias basketball players
Olympic basketball players of Argentina
Peñarol de Mar del Plata basketball players
Regatas Corrientes basketball players
Basketball players from Buenos Aires
Pan American Games competitors for Argentina